The Contemporary Museum of Calligraphy, dedicated to the art of calligraphy, is situated in Sokolniki Park, Moscow. The museum collection features calligraphy masterpieces from 65 countries. The concept was elaborated by Sokolniki Exhibition and Convention Centre and the National Union of Calligraphers.

The museum was officially opened on August 14, 2008.

Contemporary museum of calligraphy is a member of International Council of Museums (ICOM), American Alliance of Museums (AAM) and European Museum Forum (EMF). The exhibitions, organized by the museum, are supported be the Ministry of Culture of Russian Federation and are granted the auspices . In 2009 the museum's project International Exhibition of Calligraphy was approved by UFI (Global Association of the Exhibition Industry) for high professional level of exhibitions organization. In 2010 the project entered the final three of exhibitions World Cup according to Exhibition News Awards (London). In 2010 the International Exhibition of Calligraphy was certified by Russian Union of exhibitions and fairs (RUEF).

The engaged initiator and the director of the museum is Alexey Shaburov, the president of the museum-educational complex Sokolniki.

Contemporary museum of calligraphy Timeline 

August 14, 2008—the opening day of the Contemporary museum of calligraphy.

September 16–21, 2008—The I International Exhibition of Calligraphy (Repin State Academic Institute of Painting Sculpture and Architecture, Saint Petersburg).

December 9–14, 2008 — the exhibition “Mystery world of calligraphy”

December 12, 2008 — the museum shows the first and only handwritten Constitution of Russian Federation. The author is Petr Chobitko, the Chairman of the National Union of Calligraphers. Today this unique exhibit is still in the museum.

March 26, 2009 — master-class of famous Japanese calligraphers Sashida Nakefusa and Hirose Shoko.

April 14–19, 2009 — festival of Japanese culture “Sakura” in the Contemporary museum of calligraphy.

May 18, 2009 — the Contemporary museum of calligraphy become a member of the International Council of Museums (ICOM).

May 22, 2009 — the museum gets the auspice of the UNESCO RF Committee.

May 23, 2009 — the Day of Slavonic culture.

June 3, 2009 — the museum takes part in the 11th Moscow International Museum Festival “Intermuseum-2009”.

June 30, 2009 — the museum starts the contest “Holy Script in Calligraphy”

July 8, 2009 — at G8 summit Italian Prime Minister Silvio Berlusconi holly presented to the Russian president Dmitry Medvedev the Russian national anthem written by hand and beautifully illuminated. This work was created by The museum was asked by Marilena Ferrari-FMR publishing house to perform this Russian national anthem. So, a member of the National Union of Calligraphers Evgeny Drobyazin and an Italian calligrapher Barbara Calzolary, whose works are also displayed in the museum, created this anthem.

August 14, 2009 — Museum's birthday. The museum gets new exhibit — the World largest Mezuzah written by a famous Israeli calligrapher Avraham Borshevsky. This scroll is by right included into the Guinness Book of World Records.

September 23, 2009 — the museum gets a greeting letter from Kirill Patriarch of Moscow and All Rus.

October 14 — November 14, 2009 — II International Exhibition of Calligraphy (Museum- educational complex Sokolniki, Moscow). A world-famous calligrapher, a member of the UNESCO international jury on distribution of art awards Nja Mahdaoui comes to the exhibition and gives some master-classes.

November 25, 2009 — the project of the museum International Exhibition of Calligraphy are approved by UFI (Global Association of the Exhibition Industry) for high professional level of exhibitions.

March 23, 2010 — the project International Exhibition of Calligraphy becomes a finalist of exhibitions World Cup according to Exhibition News Awards (London).

March 26–28, 2010 — the Days of Japanese culture in the Contemporary museum of calligraphy.

May 27–28, 2010 — the Days of Slavonic culture in the Contemporary museum of calligraphy.

July 8, 2010 — the museum becomes a member of the American Association of Museum (AAM).

August 1, 2010 — the museum becomes a member of the European Museum Forum (EMF).

September 10–12, 2010 — III International Exhibition of Calligraphy (he territory of Yaroslav's Court, Vilikiy Novgorod). 37 000 visitors for 3 days.

November 17, 2010 — a one-day exhibition of the birch-bark manuscripts and the Four Gospels from the Novgorod State United Museum-Reserve are held.

November 18, 2010 — the opening ceremony of the National School of Calligraphy, initiated by the Contemporary museum of calligraphy. The main professor is a member of the National Union of Calligrapohers Yury Koverdiaev.

February 3, 2011 — the projects of the museum are approved by Russian Union of exhibitions and fairs (RUEF).

February 14, 2011 – St.Valentine's Day. Calligraphers sign Valentine cards.

March – May, 2011 – At weekends the Contemporary Museum of Calligraphy accommodates chamber concerts of classic music.

March 27, 2011 – The days of the Korean Script, Kim Jong Chil personally conducted a tour around the museum and a workshop.

March 29–30, 2011 – Japanese Culture Days at the museum. Workshops conducted by Japanese calligraphers Sashida Takefusa and Hirose Shoko.

June 1, 2011 – Calligraphy Fest dedicated to the International Children's Day.

October 16, 2011 – A new season was marked by a series of master-classes.

April 8, 2012 – The Day of the Slavic Eastern Egg, a celebration on Easter Eve, dedicated to painted egg tradition.

May 21, 2012 – The Day of the Slavic Script at the Contemporary Museum of Calligraphy.

November 1 – December 15, 2012 – The IV International Exhibition of Calligraphy, took place at the Contemporary Museum of Calligraphy, Moscow, traditionally featuring lectures and workshops by Russian and foreign calligraphy masters. Its distinctive characteristic was the shape-shifting exposition that had been totally changed several times during the event

March 15–21, 2013 – Korean Calligrapher Kim Jong Chil's Solo Exhibition

April 3–7, 2014 – Russia-Asia art exhibition featuring calligraphy masterpieces from China, Japan, Korea, Israel and other countries

September 12, 2014 – October 12, 2014 – V. Shapovalov's personal exhibition “Calligraphy, Water and Occasion”

November 14–30, 2014 – typographer expert, designer, calligrapher, art history Ph.D. and professor, Georgy Kozubov's exhibition to celebrate the artist's 75th birthday.

March 14 – April 12, 2015 – 90 calligraphers from over 50 countries took part in the 5th International Exhibition of Calligraphy held in Moscow in the Contemporary Museum of Calligraphy, and designed around the Contemplation of the Motherland theme.

May 5–17, 2015 – Calligraphy of the Great Victory exhibition to celebrate the 70th anniversary of the Great Patriotic War victory.

December 2–30, 2016 – Calligraphy about Moscow exhibition.

September 1–10, 2017 – The opening of the 6th International Exhibition of Calligraphy highlighted the beginning of the autumn cultural season in Moscow.

May 9–31, 2018 – a calligraphy exhibition to celebrate the Great Patriotic War victory day.

The Great Chinese Calligraphy and Painting, a new exhibition organized by the Contemporary Museum of Calligraphy, will be held in Sokolniki Park on September 20–22, 2019.

Museum innovations 
 First and still the only museum of contemporary calligraphy art in Russia.
 The exposition is formed according to principals of visual perception.
 The museum is a kind of art-workshop. People are gathering to discuss art questions, to communicate with calligraphers, to change their own art experience, to take part in collective art-making.

Museum activity 

I International Exhibition of Calligraphy was held in Saint Petersburg in 2008. 68 participants from 26 countries took part in this exhibition

II International Exhibition of Calligraphy was held in Museum-educational complex Sokolniki in Moscow in 2009. More than 100 calligraphers from 34 countries. The exhibition halls’ total area is about 5 000 sq.m.

III International Exhibition of Calligraphy was held in Velikiy Novgorod in 2010. For this exhibition a special pavilion was built in the city historic centre near the Kremlin in Yaroslav's Court. 135 calligraphers from 43 countries.

The IV International Exhibition of Calligraphy at the Contemporary Museum of Calligraphy, Moscow, attended by 143 calligraphers from 44 countries (footnotes 10–11).

The 5th International Exhibition of Calligraphy was held in the Contemporary Museum of Calligraphy in Moscow. The anniversary event featured 90 calligraphers from 52 countries, which presented 201 calligraphy works.

A dedicated exhibit hall was erected for the 6th International Exhibition of Calligraphy in Sokolniki. A record in scale and scope, the event featured over 350 works by 150 calligraphers from over 60 countries. The agenda was no less eventful, including Kim Jong Chil's calligraphy performance, Luo Lei's talk and demonstration of the Chinese writing development history, Bilibin's Style Capital workshop by Marina Khankova and more.

The common number of visitors of these three big events is about 84 000.

 Cultural Festivals and Events

April 14–19, 2009 — festival of Japanese culture “Sakura” in the Contemporary museum of calligraphy.

March 26–28, 2010 — the Days of Japanese culture in the Contemporary museum of calligraphy.

May 23, 2009 and May 27–28, 2010 — the Days of Slavonic culture in the Contemporary museum of calligraphy.

 Master-classes

The Contemporary museum of calligraphy regularly organizes master-classes of Russian calligraphers and famous masters of writing art from abroad.

As the link between calligraphy and other kinds of art is very close, the museum cooperates with the artists, musicians, poets and other people of art for organization of little events.

 The National School of Calligraphy

The School was open on November, 2010. The School's aim is to show people what calligraphy art is, explore the history of different fonts, teach to use different pens, give basics of beautiful writing. The senior professor is Yury Koverdyaev, graphic artist, calligrapher, member of Russian Union of Artists.

Exposition 
The museum has the world's largest and most comprehensive collection of national Russian calligraphy, European writing systems, samples of Hebrew calligraphy, colorful Arabic calligraphy, ancient Georgian calligraphy, strict Japanese hieroglyphs and ancient Chinese calligraphy. These art creations reveal to a man the history and continuous development of world writing systems. Calligraphy art pieces are added by rare handwritten books, pens and writing implements.

Museum's holdings include over 4000 unique calligraphy works dating back to the 20th – early 21st century, created by 460 renowned artists from 65 countries.

The most famous exhibits in the museum are:
 Handwritten Constitution of the Russian Federation
 Decalogue (Ten Commandments)
 The World-famous Mezuzah 
 Sacral calligraphy collection

Samples of sacred calligraphy

The Contemporary museum of calligraphy is a new and unique institution that unites painting, graphics and writing.

Apart from its permanent exposition the museum is the official organizer of the International exhibition of calligraphy.

The Contemporary Museum of Calligraphy is located at Pavilion 7 of the museum-educational complex Sokolniki.

References

Calligraphy museums 
 Contemporary museum of calligraphy
 Bartlhaus
 Hill Museum & Manuscript Library
 The Karpeles Manuscript Library 
 Manuscript Museum (MsM)
 Naritasan Calligraphy museum
 The Modern Calligraphy Collection of the National Art Library at the Victoria and Albert Museum
 Ditchling Museum
 Klingspor Museum 
 Sakip Sabanci Museum

Calligraphy exhibitions 
 International Exhibition of Calligraphy
 Calligraphy Exhibition at Ethos Art Gallery
 Japanese calligraphy exhibition

World calligraphy association 
 National Union of Calligraphers
 Association for the Calligraphic Arts 
 North West Calligraphers’ Association 
 The Chinese Calligraphy Association
 The Washington Calligraphers Guild
 Calligraphy Society of Florida
 The International Association of Master Penmen, Engrossers and Teachers of Handwriting IAMPETH
 L’esperluette 
 Centro Internazionale Arti Calligrafiche
 Peannairi (Irish Scribes)
 Associazione Calligrafica Italiana (ACI)
 Meitokai
 Calligraphy & Lettering Arts Society

Press coverage 
 The Diplomat magazine. Treasures of Calligraphy, 1.2009

 Mospress. Official web-portal of the Moscow government - available in Russian

 RIA Novosti - available in Russian

Art museums and galleries in Moscow
Calligraphy organizations, societies, and schools
Literary museums in Russia